Nitro was a Spanish television channel owned by Atresmedia. Its programming was aimed towards a male audience.

History
The channel ceased broadcasting on 5 May 2014, as a consequence of a sentence by the Supreme Court of Spain that annulled the concessions for nine channels broadcasting in DTT, because their permissions for frequencies were granted without the required public consensus and assignments system according to the Audiovisual Law.

References

External links
 Official website

Television channels and stations established in 2010
Television channels and stations disestablished in 2014
Atresmedia Televisión
Atresmedia channels